The 1990 NBA Finals was the championship round of the 1989–90 National Basketball Association (NBA) season, and the conclusion of the season's playoffs. The series pitted the defending NBA champion and Eastern Conference playoff champion Detroit Pistons against the Western Conference playoff champion Portland Trail Blazers. This was the first NBA Finals since 1979 not to involve either the Los Angeles Lakers or the Boston Celtics, and one of two NBA championships of the 1990s won by a team other than the Chicago Bulls or the Houston Rockets (the other was won by the San Antonio Spurs in 1999).

The Pistons became just the third franchise in NBA history to win back-to-back championships, after the Lakers and Celtics.

Background

Portland Trail Blazers

The Trail Blazers last made the NBA Finals when they won the NBA championship in 1977. In between finals appearances, the Blazers made the playoffs every year except 1982, but most of the time were eliminated in the first or second round. Along the way, Portland built a core that would turn the team into title contenders, adding Clyde Drexler, Terry Porter and Jerome Kersey through the draft while signing or trading for players such as Buck Williams and Kevin Duckworth. The addition of Williams cost Portland once-promising center Sam Bowie, whose career had been curtailed by a series of leg injuries after being drafted second overall in the 1984 NBA draft. Early in the 1988–89 season, the Blazers fired head coach Mike Schuler and replaced him with assistant Rick Adelman, who would go on to win over 1,000 regular season games in 23 NBA seasons.

Entering the 1989–90 season with modest expectations, the Trail Blazers surprised the NBA by posting a 59–23 record, good enough for the third seed in the Western Conference. In the playoffs, they swept the Dallas Mavericks in the first round, defeated the San Antonio Spurs in seven games during the second round, and eliminated the Phoenix Suns in six games in the conference finals.

Detroit Pistons

The Pistons won their first NBA championship a year earlier. However, they entered the 1989–90 season without rugged forward Rick Mahorn, who had been selected by the Minnesota Timberwolves in the 1989 NBA Expansion Draft and was later traded to the Philadelphia 76ers.

Despite the loss of Mahorn, the Pistons still managed to post a 59–23 record to lead the Eastern Conference. With Mahorn gone, Defensive Player of the Year winner Dennis Rodman picked up the slack, keeping the Pistons in true "Bad Boys" form all season. On their way to the Finals, Detroit swept the Indiana Pacers in the first round, defeated the New York Knicks in five games during the second round, and overcame their archrival Chicago Bulls in seven games in the conference finals.

Road to the Finals

Regular season series
Both teams split the two meetings, each won by the home team:

Team rosters

Detroit Pistons

Portland Trail Blazers

Series summary

The Pistons became the first team in Finals history to win Games 3 through 5 in the 2–3–2 series format which was used between 1985 and 2013.

This would be the last series to be played on a Tuesday–Thursday–Sunday rotation until the 2004 series. (Which was, coincidentally, also won by Detroit in 5 games.) From 1991 to 2003, the series were primarily on Wednesday–Friday–Sunday. Game three is the most recent NBA Finals game to tip off earlier than 8:30 p.m. Eastern/5:30 p.m. Pacific time.

Game 1

The Blazers led 90–80 with seven minutes left and looked poised to steal one on the road. But, after a timeout, Isiah Thomas got the Pistons going with a layup and a jumper. Then Joe Dumars completed a three-point play and Aguirre scored on an offensive rebound. In less than three minutes, Detroit had tightened the game to 92–89.

Buck Williams hit a jumper to make the score 94–89, but then Thomas scored seven straight points on two free throws, a three-point shot, and an 18-footer to give the Pistons their first lead. With 1:49 left, Thomas put a final dagger into the Blazers by sticking an open three-pointer for a 99–94 lead. The Pistons went on to win, 105–99.

This was the first Finals assignment for referee Dick Bavetta, who had been an NBA official since the 1975-76 season. He would go on to set the league record for most games officiated and was inducted into the Naismith Basketball Hall of Fame in 2015.

A little under a month after the release of her debut single Vision of Love, future best selling recording artist Mariah Carey performed a heavily acclaimed rendition of "America the Beautiful".

Game 2

The Blazers, playing surprisingly well on the road, had control of the game past the third quarter. Behind Bill Laimbeer, however, the Pistons made a comeback in the fourth period. Laimbeer, who had scored only seven points over the first three periods, went wild in the fourth and overtime, making 19 points over the last 17 minutes. For the game, he successfully converted six three-pointers, tying a Finals record set by the Lakers' Michael Cooper in 1987.

The Pistons had a 94–91 lead with 49 seconds left after a John Salley tip-in. Five seconds later, Clyde Drexler, who would finish with 33 points, made a free throw. With 23 seconds left, Isiah Thomas missed a potential game-clinching layup. Terry Porter tied the game at 94 with a pair of free throws with 10 seconds left, and the game went to overtime when Thomas missed an 18-footer at the buzzer.

A hook shot by James Edwards and two three-pointers by Laimbeer gave the Pistons a 102–98 lead with 1:30 left in overtime. Porter hit another set of free throws to trim the lead to two; then Drexler tied it at the one-minute mark with a 17-footer.

Portland took the lead at 104–102 when Thomas fouled out with 1:10 left. Laimbeer promptly bailed the Pistons out with 4.1 seconds remaining by hitting a 25-foot three-pointer for a 105–104 lead.

Portland gave the ball to Drexler, who was fouled by Dennis Rodman, playing on a sore ankle, with two seconds left. Drexler made both foul shots to give the Blazers the 106–105 lead. The Pistons quickly passed the ball to Edwards, who tried a shot from the left of the paint, but rookie Clifford Robinson blocked it at the last second. With that, the Blazers won the game and took away the home-court advantage.

Game 2 of the 1990 Finals marked the first time in six years that a Finals game went into overtime, the last being Game 4 of the 1984 NBA Finals.

The Pistons lose their first playoff game in the Palace at Auburn Hills, snapping their 14-game winning streak.

Game 3

Joe Dumars' father, Joe Dumars II, died of congestive heart failure  hours before the tipoff of Game 3. He had had severe diabetes, which resulted in the amputation of both of his legs in 1985. As his father's condition worsened, Dumars realized that the news of his father's death might come before or during an important game. So he asked Debbie, his new wife, not to inform him of any news until after the game had ended. His father had instilled such professionalism in Dumars, and his wife kept his wish.

Two things were stacked against the Pistons. One, they had not won in Portland since October 19, 1974, the second game of Bill Walton's career. Two, they would be without Dennis Rodman, whose ankle had stiffened. But, Vinnie Johnson found his range for the first time, making 9 of 13 shots for 21 points. The consummate professional Dumars was the most potent, however, leading Detroit with 33 points on an array of shots. One such shot was a three-pointer that stifled a Blazer run after they had cut the Piston lead to 68–60 in the third.

Detroit won, 121–106. Dumars' wife then used a courtside phone to inform Joe of his father's death. Dumars decided he would play the next game but declined press interviews.

Game 4

The Pistons were plagued with shooting problems as the Blazers raced off to a 32–22 lead at the end of the first period. But Vinnie Johnson and Joe Dumars took over, leading a 9–0 run that pulled the Pistons to 32–31 with 7:49 left in the half. The Pistons led 51–46 at intermission as the suffocating Detroit defense held the Blazers to 14 second-quarter points.

Isiah Thomas scored 22 points in the third and capped his onslaught with a three-pointer at the 2:15 mark that gave the Pistons an 81–65 lead and seemed to quiet the Portland crowd.

But, over the next eight minutes, the Blazers suddenly remembered the pressure defense and running game that had gotten them to the NBA Finals. They went on a 28–11 run of their own, and Terry Porter drove for a layup to give them a 93–92 lead with 5:20 left.

The game became a nip-and-tuck affair until Detroit led 106–102 on a jumper by Dumars at 1:16, but the Blazers fought back and had a chance to tie it with 35 seconds left. Buck Williams missed one of two free throws and Portland trailed 106–105.

Four seconds later, in a scramble under the Pistons' basket, Bill Laimbeer drew his sixth foul, disqualifying him for the remainder of the game. Clyde Drexler made both free throws to give Portland the lead, 107–106, with 31.8 seconds left. But Thomas responded by sinking a 22-footer that returned the edge to Detroit 108–107.

With nine seconds left, Porter attempted to drive on Dumars, but Joe blocked his path. Thomas scooped up the ensuing loose ball and headed the other way. Danny Young quickly fouled him as he let fly a 55-footer that went in. The officials quickly ruled it no good, as the foul occurred before the shot, but Thomas made the free throws for a 110–107 lead with 8.4 seconds showing.

Mark Aguirre then fouled Porter with 6.5 seconds left, and he made both, drawing Portland to 110–109. On the ensuing play, James Edwards got the ball downcourt to a wide-open Gerald Henderson for an easy layup and a 112–109 lead. Portland now had the ball and 1.8 seconds to get a shot.

The Blazers whipped the ball upcourt to Young, who promptly knocked down a 35-footer from the right sideline. Immediately players from both benches came onto the floor, the Blazers believing the game was now tied and the Pistons believing otherwise. Veteran referee Earl Strom, calling his final NBA game, huddled the officials amid the din and signaled that the shot was too late. Videotaped replays later confirmed the accuracy of the call. The Blazers were down, three games to one.

Game 5

For much of Game 5 it appeared Portland would at least send the series back to Detroit. The Pistons shot poorly starting out, missing seven of their first 11 shots, but still led 26–22 after one quarter. They held the same four-point edge at the half, 46–42, but the Blazers rallied in the third period, and with 10 minutes to play in the game, they led 76–68.

Vinnie Johnson then went on the first of two scoring streaks. "The Microwave" scored all of Detroit's points in a 9–0 run to give his team a 77–76 edge with 6:35 to go. The Blazers stepped up their pressure and again built a 90–83 lead with 2:05 left. But, when Clyde Drexler fouled out, Portland could not score the rest of the way and "The Microwave" heated up again. Johnson scored seven points in Detroit's astounding 9–0 run to close the game and the series. His last shot was a 15-footer from the right sideline with Jerome Kersey draped all over him and 0:00.7 showing on the clock. Terry Porter had a last chance to force a Game 6, but his three clanked off the rim.

Isiah Thomas was named the Finals MVP. He had scored 33, 23, 21, 32 and 29 points, respectively, in the five games. From three-point range he had made 11 of 16 shots. For the series, he had averaged 27.6 points, 8.0 assists, and 5.2 rebounds, a performance that caused him to unleash his full smile afterward.

"You can say what you want about me," he said, "but you can't say that I'm not a winner."

Player statistics

Detroit Pistons

|-
| align="left" |  || 5 || 3 || 24.0 || .333 || .500 || .667 || 3.6 || 0.8 || 0.4 || 0.0 || 9.6 
|-
| align="left" |  || 5 || 5 || 42.0 || .415 || .286 || .892 || 2.8 || 5.6 || 0.8 || 0.0 || 20.6 
|-
| align="left" |  || 5 || 5 || 27.6 || .446 || .000 || .560 || 3.8 || 0.8 || 0.4 || 0.6 || 14.4 
|-
| align="left" |  || 3 || 0 || 11.0 || .333 || .000 || .500 || 3.0 || 0.0 || 0.3 || 0.0 || 1.0 
|-
| align="left" |  || 2 || 0 || 2.0 || .000 || .000 || .000 || 0.0 || 0.0 || 0.0 || 0.0 || 0.0 
|-
| align="left" |  || 2 || 0 || 1.0 || 1.000 || .000 || .000 || 0.0 || 0.0 || 0.0 || 0.0 || 1.0 
|-
| align="left" |  || 5 || 0 || 22.6 || .543 || .000 || .786 || 2.0 || 1.2 || 0.2 || 0.6 || 12.2 
|-
| align="left" |  || 5 || 5 || 38.2 || .444 || .364 || 1.000 || 13.4 || 2.4 || 1.4 || 0.6 || 13.2 
|-
| align="left" |  || 4 || 2 || 19.8 || .444 || .000 || .250 || 5.5 || 0.8 || 0.5 || 0.5 || 2.3 
|-
| align="left" |  || 5 || 0 || 28.6 || .375 || .000 || .692 || 6.4 || 0.4 || 0.2 || 2.4 || 6.6 
|-! style="background:#FDE910;"
| align="left" |  || 5 || 5 || 38.4 || .542 || .688 || .742 || 5.2 || 7.0 || 1.6 || 0.4 || 27.6 

Portland Trail Blazers

|-
| align="left" |  || 2 || 0 || 4.5 || .000 || .000 || .500 || 1.0 || 0.0 || 0.0 || 0.0 || 0.5 
|-
| align="left" |  || 5 || 0 || 14.0 || .333 || .000 || .250 || 4.0 || 0.2 || 0.4 || 0.8 || 1.8 
|-
| align="left" |  || 5 || 5 || 40.8 || .543 || .167 || .757 || 7.8 || 6.2 || 1.8 || 0.2 || 26.4 
|-
| align="left" |  || 5 || 5 || 29.8 || .523 || .000 || .667 || 5.6 || 0.0 || 0.2 || 0.4 || 15.6 
|-
| align="left" |  || 5 || 5 || 41.2 || .473 || .000 || .781 || 7.0 || 1.2 || 0.6 || 0.6 || 19.0 
|-
| align="left" |  || 4 || 0 || 7.3 || .357 || .000 || .000 || 0.3 || 0.5 || 0.3 || 0.0 || 2.5 
|-
| align="left" |  || 5 || 5 || 41.2 || .393 || .280 || .889 || 2.6 || 8.4 || 2.0 || 0.2 || 19.0 
|-
| align="left" |  || 5 || 0 || 16.4 || .250 || .000 || .500 || 2.4 || 0.8 || 0.8 || 0.8 || 3.8 
|-
| align="left" |  || 5 || 5 || 38.4 || .465 || .000 || .640 || 9.0 || 1.8 || 0.6 || 0.2 || 11.2 
|-
| align="left" |  || 5 || 0 || 15.6 || .400 || .333 || .333 || 1.4 || 1.6 || 0.6 || 0.2 || 3.0

Television coverage
The NBA on CBS ended a 17-year run, as the league was moving to NBC after the 1990 NBA Finals. In their goodbye montage, CBS used Marvin Gaye's rendition of "The Star-Spangled Banner" from the 1983 NBA All-Star Game. Pat O'Brien (anchor), Lesley Visser (the Pistons' sideline), James Brown (the Trail Blazers' sideline), Dick Stockton (play-by-play) and Hubie Brown (color commentary) called the action for CBS.

After CBS' run with the NBA ended, Brown moved to Turner Sports to fill the same role. Stockton would not call another NBA game until , when he also joined Turner. Stockton and Brown would occasionally be paired together on TBS and TNT until , when Brown was hired to coach the Memphis Grizzlies.

Aftermath
The Pistons would not make a fourth consecutive Finals championship visit in the 1990–91 NBA season. Dealing with an injured Isiah Thomas for 34 games, they went 50–32, but a matured and stronger Chicago Bulls team swept them in four games of the Eastern Conference Finals. The Bulls won the championship that season. Within a few seasons, the Pistons dynasty broke up, with key players, including Thomas, retiring or moving on as free agents to other teams. They would not return to the Finals until 2004. Dennis Rodman, James Edwards and John Salley would win a championship in 1996 with the Bulls.

The Trail Blazers won the Pacific Division title by winning a franchise-record 63 games in 1991, acquiring the league's best record. They were, however, denied a second straight trip to the NBA Finals, losing to the Los Angeles Lakers in six games at the Western Conference Finals. The Blazers returned to the Finals the year after that in 1992, but lost to the Bulls in the championship series, four games to two.

See also
1990 NBA Playoffs

References

External links
NBA History

National Basketball Association Finals
Finals
NBA
NBA
GMA Network television specials
Basketball competitions in Portland, Oregon
1990 in sports in Michigan
1990 in sports in Oregon
1990 in Detroit
1990 in Portland, Oregon
Basketball competitions in Detroit
June 1990 sports events in the United States